Hunk-O-Mania is an American male entertainment company known for featuring male strippers and male dancers. The company operates in 19 cities in the United States.

History
Hunk-O-Mania, LLC began in New York City in 1998 with three performers and two backup dancers.

In 2007, Hunk-O-Mania expanded into Atlantic City, NJ and began its first show.

In 2008, Hunk-O-Mania began its first show in Chicago, Illinois. In 2011, Hunk-O-Mania opened its first show in Philadelphia, Pennsylvania.

In 2012, Hunk-O-Mania began a show in the Houston, Texas. In 2013, Hunk-O-Mania expanded into the Boston, Massachusetts and Miami, Florida, areas.

The Hunk-O-Mania show is a subsidiary of New-Age Productions and Sales Jet, Inc.

Services
Hunk-O-Mania provides entertainment for women celebrating milestones in their lives including bachelorette parties, birthday parties and divorce parties. Hunk-O-Mania also travels to cities and other countries for their performances.

See also
 Strip club
 Stripper
 Chippendales
 Magic Mike
 Dreamboys

References

External links
Official website 
"The Male Strippers of Hunk-O-Mania Chicago Talk Myths, Money and Magic Mike" (June 20, 2019) Chicago Tribune article on the company

Entertainment companies established in 1998
Entertainment companies of the United States
American male dancers
Adult entertainment companies